Sunflower is the fifth studio album by American rock band Never Shout Never. It was released on July 2, 2013 by Loveway Records. The album features the full band recording as a whole for the third time; the first being in Time Travel, the second on Indigo.

Track listing
Track listing according to iTunes.

Release history

References

2013 albums
Never Shout Never albums